Mavana Magalu is a 1965 Indian Kannada-language film, directed by S. K. A. Chari and produced by A. V. Subba Rao. The film stars Jayalalitha, Kalyan Kumar, K. S. Ashwath and T. N. Balakrishna. The film has musical score by T. Chalapathi Rao.

Cast
 
J. Jayalalithaa
Kalyan Kumar
K. S. Ashwath 
T. N. Balakrishna
Narasimharaju 
Ranga 
Guggu 
Rangabhoomi Narayan 
Girimaji 
H. R. Sharma 
Shivaram
Shivaji 
Master Basavaraj 
Master Yogindrakumar 
Swamy Rao 
H. M. Gowda 
Bhaskar 
Bangalore Basappa 
B. Jayamma
Vidyavathi 
B. Jayashree 
Vasanthi
Baby Padmashree 
Sharada

Soundtrack
The music was composed by T. Chalapathi Rao.

References

1965 films
1960s Kannada-language films
Films scored by T. Chalapathi Rao